Urodynamic testing or urodynamics is a study that assesses how the bladder and urethra are performing their job of storing and releasing urine. Urodynamic tests can help explain symptoms such as:
 incontinence
 frequent urination
 sudden, strong urges to urinate but nothing comes out
 problems starting a urine stream
 painful urination
 problems emptying the bladder completely (Vesical tenesmus, detrusor failure)
 recurrent urinary tract infections

Urodynamic tests are usually performed in Urology, Gynecology, OB/GYN, Internal medicine, and Primary care offices.  Urodynamics will provide the physician with the information necessary to diagnose the cause and nature of a patient's incontinence, thus giving the best treatment options available. Urodynamics is typically conducted by urologists or urogynecologists.

Purpose of testing
The tests are most often arranged for men with enlarged prostate glands, and for women with incontinence that has either failed conservative treatment or requires surgery.
Probably the most important group in whom these tests are performed are those with a neuropathy such as spinal injury. In some of these patients (dependent on the level of the lesion), the micturition reflex can be essentially out of control and the detrusor pressures generated can be life-threatening.

Symptoms reported by the patient are an unreliable guide to the underlying dysfunction of the lower urinary tract. The purpose of urodynamics is to provide objective confirmation of the pathology that a patient's symptoms would suggest.

For example, a patient complaining of urinary urgency (or rushing to the toilet), with increased frequency of urination can have overactive bladder syndrome. The cause of this might be detrusor overactivity, in which the bladder muscle (the detrusor) contracts unexpectedly during bladder filling. Urodynamics can be used to confirm the presence of detrusor overactivity, which may help guide treatment. An overactive detrusor can be associated with urge incontinence. The American Urogynecologic Society does not recommend that urodynamics are part of initial diagnosis for uncomplicated overactive bladder.

Specific tests
These tests may be as simple as urinating behind a curtain while a doctor listens, but are usually more extensive in western medicine. A typical urodynamic test takes about 30 minutes to perform. It involves the use of a small catheter used to fill the bladder and record measurements. What is done depends on what the presenting problem is, but some of the common tests conducted are;
 Post-void residual volume: Most tests begin with the insertion of a urinary catheter/transducer following complete bladder emptying by the patient. The urine volume is measured (this shows how efficiently the bladder empties). High volumes (180 ml) may be associated with urinary tract infections. A volume of greater than 50 ml in children has been described as constituting post-void residual urine. High levels can be associated with overflow incontinence.
 The urine is often sent for microscopy and culture to check for infection.
 Uroflowmetry: Free uroflowmetry measures how fast the patient can empty his/her bladder. Pressure uroflowmetry again measures the rate of voiding, but with simultaneous assessment of bladder and rectal pressures. It helps demonstrate the reasons for difficulty in voiding, for example bladder muscle weakness or obstruction of the bladder outflow.
 Multichannel cystometry: measures the pressure in the rectum and in the bladder, using two pressure catheters, to deduce the presence of contractions of the bladder wall, during bladder filling, or during other provocative maneuvers. The strength of the urethra can also be tested during this phase, using a cough or Valsalva maneuver, to confirm genuine stress incontinence.
 Urethral pressure profilometry: measures strength of sphincter contraction.
 Electromyography (EMG) measurement of electrical activity in the bladder neck.
 Assessing the "tightness" along the length of the urethra.
 Fluoroscopy (moving video x-rays) of the bladder and bladder neck during voiding.

Standardization
Men with benign prostate hyperplasia are influenced by urination position: sitting improves three measures — namely, the maximum urinary flow rate (Qmax), voiding time (TQ) and post-void residual volume (PVR). Qmax, in particular, improves by an amount similar to that achievable with four alpha-1 blockers, medicines commonly prescribed for BPH. This information offers a non-pharmaceutical way of managing the condition, and shows that urodynamics measurements should use a standardized position, to avoid misleading results.

References

External links
 National Institute of Health 
 4/Feb/2012 Archive of Doug Small's urodynamic pages

Urine tests
Urologic procedures